Metallolophia variegata is a moth of the family Geometridae first described by Jeremy Daniel Holloway in 1996. It is found on Borneo. The habitat consists of lower montane forests.

The length of the forewings is 16–17 mm. Adults are ashy grey, strongly marked with black fasciae and discal rings. The underside is medium to pale grey with faintly darker ghosts of the upperside fasciation except for the discal and basal marks of the forewing.

References

Moths described in 1996
Pseudoterpnini